Reusability is a term in computer science.

Reusability may also refer to:

The quality of being fit for reuse
Reusable packaging

See also